Carroll Stagecoach Inn, also known as Costello Farm, was a historic inn located near Oregon, Holt County, Missouri.  It was built in 1844, and was a two-story rectangular building of wood framing built on a limestone foundation. It measured 35 feet by 17 feet and had a gable roof. An addition was made in 1924. Also on the property were the contributing pole barn (1844), sawmill, and the grave of Jesse Carroll.

It was listed on the National Register of Historic Places in 1983 and delisted in 1994.

References

Former National Register of Historic Places in Missouri
Hotel buildings on the National Register of Historic Places in Missouri
Hotel buildings completed in 1844
Buildings and structures in Holt County, Missouri
National Register of Historic Places in Holt County, Missouri